Department of Police may refer to a police department, or specifically to:

 Department of Police, Delhi
 Department of Police (South Africa)